The 2008 CONCACAF Beach Soccer Championship, also known as the 2008 FIFA Beach Soccer World Cup qualifiers for (CONCACAF), was the second beach soccer championship for North America, Central America and the Caribbean, held in April 2008, in Puerto Vallarta, Mexico.
Mexico won the championship, with El Salvador finishing second. The two nations moved on to play in the 2008 FIFA Beach Soccer World Cup in Marseille, France, from July 17 to 27.

Participating nations

 (hosts)

Matches

Day 1

Day 2

Day 3

Final standings

Winners

Awards

References

Beach
FIFA Beach Soccer World Cup qualification (CONCACAF)
Beach
International association football competitions hosted by Mexico
2008 in beach soccer